The Fight is a 2018 British family drama film, the debut as writer-director for Jessica Hynes. The film stars Hynes, Russell Brand, Anita Dobson, Rhona Mitra, Christopher Fairbank, Sennia Nanua, Alice Lowe, Sally Phillips and Liv Hill.

Cast
 Jessica Hynes as Tina Bell 
 Russell Brand as The Guru
 Anita Dobson as Gene Dunn
 Rhona Mitra as Amanda Chadwick
 Christopher Fairbank as Frank Dunn
 Sennia Nanua as Emma Bell 
 Alice Lowe as Home school teacher 
 Sally Phillips as Beth Hunter
 Liv Hill as Jordan Chadwick
 Shaun Parkes as Micky Bell

Plot
Tina is a mother of three who with her husband on nightshifts, her eldest daughter being bullied at school and her parents' relationship in trouble, is feeling overwhelmed. With the reappearance of a former school rival Tina steps into the boxing ring and discovers how to fight for herself.

Production
The film was predominantly shot in and around Folkestone, Kent in 12 days with cinematographer Ryan Eddleston. Locations included Cornwallis Avenue, Folkestone Harbour Arm, Folkestone Coastal Park, The Warren, Lower Radnor Park, Folkestone academy and Folkestone amateur boxing club.

Release
The Fight premiered at the 2018 London Film Festival and was released in the United Kingdom on 15 March 2019. , it has  approval rating on Rotten Tomatoes, based on  critical reviews.

Accolades
Hynes was nominated for best first screen play at the 2020 Writers' Guild of Great Britain awards.
Eddleston was nominated for BAFTA Cymru for his Cinematography at the BAFTA Cymru 2019 awards

External links

References

2018 directorial debut films
2018 drama films
2018 films
British sports drama films
2010s sports drama films
Films shot in Kent
Folkestone
2010s English-language films
2010s British films